Harutaeographa eriza is a moth of the family Noctuidae. It is found in the Himalaya, Pakistan and India (Punjab).

References

Moths described in 1901
Orthosiini